United Nations Security Council resolution 802, adopted unanimously on 25 January 1993, after reaffirming Resolution 713 (1991) and all subsequent relevant resolutions and expressing its concern at offensives by the Croatian Army in the United Nations Protected Areas, the council demanded the immediate cessation of hostilities and the withdrawal of Croatian forces from the areas.

The council also condemned the attacks on the United Nations Protection Force (UNPROFOR), demanding that weapons seized from the force at warehouses be returned immediately. It also called on all parties and others concerned to comply strictly with the ceasefire arrangements and the United Nations peacekeeping plan, including the disbanding and demobilisation of Serb Territorial Defence units and others.

The resolution then expressed condolences to the families of those killed from UNPROFOR, demanding the parties in the region respect the safety of the Force. It also demanded that all parties co-operate with the protection force and allow civilian traffic to use the crossings at Maslenica and in Split.

See also
 Breakup of Yugoslavia
 Bosnian War
 Croatian War of Independence
 List of United Nations Security Council Resolutions 801 to 900 (1993–1994)
 Republic of Serbian Krajina
 Yugoslav Wars

References

External links
 
Text of the Resolution at undocs.org

 0802
 0802
1993 in Croatia
1993 in Yugoslavia
 0802
January 1993 events